The 2009 Changchun Yatai season was Changchun Yatai's third consecutive season in the Chinese Super League since its debut season in 2007. This season Changchun Yatai participated in the Chinese Super League and AFC Champions League.

Review and events

Monthly events
This is a list of the significant events to occur at the club during the 2009 season, presented in chronological order. This list does not include transfers, which are listed in the transfers section below, or match results, which are in the results section.

March:
 22 – Played first match in 2009 season at Helong Stadium.  Zong Lei won the player of the match, after a 0–0 draw with Changsha Ginde.
 28 – Caballero and Subasic left to compete in WCQ for national team.  Tang Jing headed in an indirect freekick assisted by Captain Du Zhenyu.  It is the first goal for Changchun Yatai and the first win in season 2009.
 29 – Announce to play home games in Changchun Economics Development Area Stadium.

May:
 10 – Lost 2–6 in the home game against Beijing Guoan.  It is the biggest defeat since Changchun promoted into Chinese Super League.
 25 – Changchun Yatai U-15 team were crowned Champions of China and will be joining the rest of finalists in Manchester United Premier Cup this summer.

June:
 1 – Cao Tianbao make his debut for  against .
 28 – After 1170 minutes' goal drought, Branimir Subašić score twice in first half.  Later in the second half of the game, the home team Dalian Shide scored 3 goals and take the 3 points.
 29 – Branimir Subašić retired from international football on 29 June 2009.

July:
 7 – Changchun Yatai was praised for the good performance in the first half season summary of the league by FA.
 17 – The club held trials for U-13 team.  About 150 players take part in the trials.
 15 Changchun Yatai U19 team finish second in Chinese U–19 League 2009.
 25 – Yan Feng was called up into Gao Hongbo's squad to face Kyrgyzstan in a 3–0 win on 25 July 2009.

September:
 2 Changchun Yatai U17 team win Chinese U–17 League 2009 with 5 wins 1 draw and 1 loss.

Squad details

Players information
(As to 20 September 2009, Club Apps/Goals before 2009 season are not accurate.)

Kit profile

|
|

Matches

Chinese Super League

Chinese Super League statistics

League table

Results summary

Round by round

Season statistics
(As to 20 September 2009)

Starts and goals

Goalscorers

Assists

Yellow cards

Red cards

Captains

Penalties awarded

Suspensions served

Overall

Transfers

Transfers in

Transfers out

Loans in

Loans out

References

Chinese football clubs 2009 season
2009 in Chinese sport